Cardiff School District is a public school district serving the community of Cardiff in the city of Encinitas, in the North County area of San Diego County, California. It consists of two schools: Cardiff Elementary (grades K-3) and Ada Harris Elementary (grades 3-6). It is managed by an elected five-member board of trustees.

References

External links
 

School districts in San Diego County, California